Ko-Suen "Bill" Moo was a Taiwanese businessman convicted of being a covert agent of the People's Republic of China in May 2006.  He attempted to purchase United States military equipment to send back to China but was arrested by undercover United States agents. Some of the equipment Mr. Moo tried to purchase included an F-16 fighter jet engine, an AGM-129A cruise missile, UH-60 Black Hawk helicopter engines, and AIM-120 air-to-air missiles.

References
 "How China Steals U.S. Military Secrets", Popular Mechanics, July 2009 
 "China broadens espionage operations", USA Today, May 2006 
 "Ex-Lockheed Martin agent gets six-and-a-half years", The Taipei Times, July 2006 

Chinese spies
Living people
People convicted of spying for the People's Republic of China
Year of birth missing (living people)